Lucius Columbus "Lee" Fyfe (July 31, 1879 – May 30, 1942) was a professional baseball umpire.

Fyfe umpired 84 Federal League games in the  season.

References

1879 births
1942 deaths
Major League Baseball umpires
Sportspeople from Illinois